Saad Balobaid (born 27 January 2000) is a Saudi Arabian professional footballer who plays as a left-back for Saudi Pro League side Al-Taawoun.

Club career
Balobaid started his career at the youth team of Al-Taawoun. He made his first-team debut on 24 October 2020 in the AFC Champions League group stage match against Qatari side Al-Duhail. He came off the bench in the 38th minute following an injury to Hamdan Al-Ruwaili. On 23 October 2020, Balobaid signed his first professional contract with the club. On 6 November 2020, Balobaid made his Pro League in the 1–1 draw against Al-Ittihad. He made 3 further appearances during the 2020–21 season. On 17 September 2021, Balobaid made his first appearance of the 2021–22 season in the 5–3 derby defeat to Al-Raed. He made 21 appearances and assisted twice during the course of the 2021–22 season as Al-Taawoun managed to finish 12th and avoid relegation. On 30 April 2022, Balobaid renewed his contract with Al-Taawoun for another three years.

International career
On 21 January 2022, Balobaid was called up to the Saudi Arabia U23 national team for the first time. He made his debut on 30 January 2022 in the 2–1 win against Qatar. On 31 May 2022, Balobaid was called up to replace Muhannad Al-Shanqeeti who withdrew from the 2022 AFC U-23 Asian Cup due to injury. He made one appearance in the tournament as the Green Falcons won their first AFC U-23 Asian Cup title.

Career statistics

Club

Honours
Saudi Arabia U23
AFC U-23 Asian Cup: 2022

References

External links
 

2000 births
Living people
People from Buraidah
Saudi Arabian footballers
Saudi Arabia youth international footballers
Association football fullbacks
Saudi Professional League players
Al-Taawoun FC players